Tremors 4: The Legend Begins (also known as Tremors 4 or Tremors: The Legend Begins) is a 2004 direct-to-video horror Western film directed by S. S. Wilson and written by Brent Maddock, Nancy Roberts, and Wilson. It is the fourth film in the Tremors series of films and released on DVD on January 2, 2004. As a prequel to the earlier films and television series, it depicts the town of Rejection, which is the location that would later be renamed Perfection, the main setting for the first Tremors film. It stars Michael Gross as Hiram Gummer, the great grandfather of the character Burt Gummer, who Gross portrayed in every other Tremors film.

Prim East Coast dandy Hiram Gummer (Gross) arrives in the town of Rejection, Nevada, to investigate a series of strange deaths at the silver mine he owns. Receiving help from local innkeeper Christine Lord (Botsford) and miner Juan Pedilla (Roam), Gummer finds out that gigantic killer worms that can burrow underground are responsible for the miners' deaths. Hiram decides he'd better call in expert gunslinger Black Hand Kelly (Billy Drago) to save the day. However, the worms grow larger and the people of Rejection decide to kill them before they reach Carson City.

Plot
In 1889, the inhabitants of Rejection are completely dependent on the income from a nearby silver mine. One day, a hot spring causes graboid eggs to hatch, resulting in the death of 17 miners. Hiram Gummer, great-grandfather of Burt Gummer (Michael Gross) and the mine's owner, arrives in town to fix the problem. After juvenile graboids that can shoot out of the ground (later dubbed Dirt Dragons) attack his camp one night, he is shocked by their presence. One of his companions, Juan, kills one with a pickaxe, and the pair escapes.

Inexperienced and not fond of firearms, Hiram calls for a gunfighter, Black Hand Kelly (Billy Drago). Hiram and Kelly do not get along well, though Kelly succeeds in conveying to Hiram some of his attitude towards firearms and life in general. Eventually, Kelly is eaten alive by a now fully grown graboid, but not before discovering that a total of four graboids have hatched. Hiram decides to abandon Rejection and leave the townsfolk to their fates. However, they force him to give them the silver mine, threatening to alert potential buyers to the danger if he sells it out from under them. In Carson City, Hiram receives a telegram revealing that the fully grown graboids have made it through the pass and are headed for the town. Changing his mind, he buys weapons with the last of his valuable belongings, heads back to Rejection to lead a last stand against the graboids, and helps the town ready itself.

After two graboids are killed, the third one adapts and avoids all of the traps. Hiram tricks it into coming to the surface and then attaches it by the tail to the flywheel of a steam traction engine. The graboid is reeled in and slammed against the front wheels and boiler with such force that it is explosively decapitated on impact. With the creatures dead, the town decides to keep them secret out of fear that no one would settle in the area if their existence were known, and use the proceeds from the mine to pay for their belongings. Hiram settles in Rejection (renamed Perfection), building his home in the same place where his great-grandson Burt's would one day be. He is also given a Colt 1865 Gatling gun and begins target practice, enjoying it.

Cast

Michael Gross as Hiram Gummer
Sara Botsford as Christine Lord
Billy Drago as Black Hand Kelly
Brent Roam as Juan Padilla
August Schellenberg as Tecopa
J. E. Freeman as Old Fred
Ming Lo as Pyong Lien Chang
Lydia Look as Lu Wan Chang
Sam Ly as Fu Yien Chang
Neal Kopit as Víctor
Sean Moram as Western Union Clerk
Matthew Seth Wilson as Brick Walters
John Dixon as Big Horse Johnson
Dan Lemieux as Stony Walters
Don Ruffin as Soggy
Lou Carlucci as Mine Foreman

Firearms used in the film

 Remington Mark III

The Remington Mark III single-shot 10-gauge pistol was the only gun used in the film that was not historically accurate, being manufactured from 1915 to 1918. According to Stampede Entertainment, "S. S. Wilson and Michael Gross loved it so much they decided to use it anyway". The handgun can be seen when Hiram gives it to Lu Wan to use in the final battle. However, Hiram calls it a "derringer". It is used by Lu Wan to blow the head off a tentacle of the graboid that attacks her on the wagon.

 Sharps 1874 buffalo rifle

The Sharps 1874 buffalo rifle was used by Juan in the final battle. It was .45–70 caliber, but Hiram refers to as a .52 caliber in the film.

 Remington No. 1 rolling block

The Remington No. 1 rolling block used in the film fired .45–70 blanks, but was called a .45–120 in the film. Pyong Chang fires it from the back of the steam traction engine during the final battle.<ref>Weapons of Tremors 4, the Remington No. 1 Rolling block. stampede-entertainment.com. Retrieved August 2, 2015</ref>

 Colt Gatling gun

The Colt Gatling gun used in the film was a genuine antique pre-1900 .45–70 caliber Colt. It was used by Hiram in the final scene of the movie.

 Punt gun

The punt gun used by Hiram in the final battle was designed by prop master Bill Davis, weighing 94 pounds (43 kg) and measuring 8 feet 4 inches (2.54 m) long. The gun had a 2-inch (5.1 cm) bore, which classifies it as an "A gauge". According to Stampede Entertainment, "The entire trigger assembly of the punt gun dropped down to allow the loading of the internal shotgun with triple load 12-gauge black powder blanks." In addition, WD-40 was sprayed into the barrel before firing which would create extra smoke.

 Others
Colt Single Action Army "The Peacemaker" – used by Black Hand Kelly as his weapon of choice
1860 Henry repeating rifle – used by Christine Lord
Smith & Wesson Model 3 – used by Old Fred
H&R Firearms single-shot – used by Fu Yien
Remington 1875 – used by Tecopa
L.C. Smith shotgun – also used by Tecopa
Winchester 1873 – used by Big Horse Johnson
Winchester 1886 – used by Juan and Black Hand Kelly in the "muling station" sequence
.22 caliber Sharps pepperbox – used by Hiram in the "muling station" sequence

ReceptionTremors 4: The Legend Begins received mostly mixed reception from fans of the franchise. In a retrospective essay on direct-to-video horror sequels, Gavin Al-Asif for the Houston Chronicle wrote that "[Tremors 4] is noticeably better than [Tremors 3] in certain aspects, but also noticeably worse in others," critiquing the film for its unconvincing effects and hokey acting while praising the film for its fun characters, often clever humor, and western setting.

Browser game
A browser game tie-in called Dirt Dragons was created to market the film and released on January 2, 2004. The game concept, development, and programming was done by the Stampede Entertainment webmaster Allan Krahl.Green, Paul. (2009). Encyclopedia of Weird Westerns: Supernatural and Science Fiction Elements in Novels, Pulps, Comics, Films, Television, and Games. McFarland. p. 211. 

The game starts off with the premise that the town Rejection, Nevada hires an experienced gunman to eliminate Graboids. The player has a selection of guns. The Sharps 1874 Buffalo Rifle, Henry 1860, Colt Peacemaker, and the Punt Gun. The Sharps has the most range and is the second most powerful but has one bullet that takes a small amount of time to reload. The Henry 1860 has 16 bullets, low-moderate damage, and a fast fire rate but takes around 30 seconds to reload. The Peacemaker has poor range and damage but an extremely fast fire rate with six bullets loaded that takes around 30 seconds to reload and is considered a last resort'' weapon. The Punt Gun has the most destructive power but only at close range while taking over a minute to reload a single shot. The objective is to kill advancing graboids that pop up while getting closer and strategize on how to conserve ammo to kill others. As a certain number is killed, the player advances to the next level which increases the amount by one for number of graboids that pop up on-screen, with a total of four levels. If all else fails to kill them, press space. If the player loses, they will be greeted with a Graboid tentacle and be eaten, ending the game.

The official game site has since been discontinued, but the game is still available on other sites.

References

External links

2004 films
2000s Western (genre) horror films
2000s monster movies
American Western (genre) horror films
American monster movies
Direct-to-video prequel films
Films set in 1889
Tremors (franchise)
Universal Pictures direct-to-video films
2000s English-language films
2000s American films
American prequel films